Novoilyinsky (masculine), Novoilyinskaya (feminine), or Novoilyinskoye (neuter) is the name of several inhabited localities in Russia.

Urban localities
Novoilyinsky, Perm Krai, a work settlement in Nytvensky District of Perm Krai

Rural localities
Novoilyinsky, Kemerovo Oblast, a settlement in Gornyatskaya Rural Territory of Leninsk-Kuznetsky District of Kemerovo Oblast
Novoilyinskoye, Nizhny Novgorod Oblast, a village in Chashchikhinsky Selsoviet of Krasnobakovsky District of Nizhny Novgorod Oblast
Novoilyinskoye, Perm Krai, a selo in Permsky District of Perm Krai
Novoilyinskaya, a village in Syrtinsky Selsoviet of Kizilsky District of Chelyabinsk Oblast